Lady Hudaeryangwon of the Yi clan was the daughter of Yi-Won from the Later Silla periods who became the 14th wife of Taejo of Goryeo.

References

External links
후대량원부인 on Naver .
후대량원부인 on Encykorea .

Year of birth unknown
Year of death unknown
Consorts of Taejo of Goryeo
People from South Gyeongsang Province